Carlos Moyá was the defending champion but lost in the third round to Gastón Gaudio.

Tommy Robredo won in the final 6–3, 4–6, 6–2, 3–6, 6–3 against Gaudio.

Seeds
A champion seed is indicated in bold text while text in italics indicates the round in which that seed was eliminated. The top eight seeds received a bye to the second round.

 n/a
  Carlos Moyá (third round)
  David Nalbandian (quarterfinals)
  Nicolás Massú (second round)
  Fernando González (quarterfinals)
  Gustavo Kuerten (quarterfinals)
  Agustín Calleri (quarterfinals)
  Tommy Robredo (champion)
  Juan Ignacio Chela (second round)
  Feliciano López (third round)
 n/a
  Dominik Hrbatý (first round)
  Gastón Gaudio (final)
  Albert Costa (first round)
  Félix Mantilla (second round)
  Mariano Zabaleta (third round)
  Flávio Saretta (second round)

Draw

Finals

Top half

Section 1

Section 2

Bottom half

Section 3

Section 4

References
 2004 Open SEAT Godó Draw

Open Torneo Godo
2004 Torneo Godó